Rock Konducta is an ongoing album series released by hip hop musician Madlib.  The term "Rock Konducta" comes from Madlib producing hip hop instrumentals using rock and roll and krautrock samples.  The series began officially in 2013 with the introduction of Rock Konducta 45.

Rock Konducta 45

Rock Konducta 45 is the introductory project to the Rock Konducta instrumental albums by hip hop producer Madlib. It was released on vinyl on Madlib Invazion Records and introduced five selected tracks from the Rock Konducta project.

Track listing
All tracks are produced and arranged by Madlib.
 "Water Or Bread (Raining)"
 "Licorice (The Beginning)" 		
 "The Mad March (Skipping Drunk)" 		
 "Stumbling (Cobblestones)" 		
 "Welcome (The End)"

Rock Konducta Pt. 1

Rock Konducta Pt. 1 is the first full length album in the Rock Konducta instrumental albums by hip hop producer Madlib. It features approx. 40 minutes of hip hop instrumentals made by Madlib using numerous samples from rock, prog rock, krautrock and psychedelic rock songs from the 60s to the 80s.

Track listing
All tracks produced by Madlib.

Madlib albums
Instrumental albums
Instrumental hip hop albums
Albums produced by Madlib